Jerrilyn Farmer is an American mystery fiction writer, author of a series of humorous 'cozy' mysteries featuring Hollywood caterer 'Madeline Bean'.

Originally from Illinois, Jerrilyn Farmer majored in Acting and English at Northern Illinois University, and moved to Los Angeles to pursue an acting career. However she found a career writing for television, mainly for game shows and sketch comedy. Her first novel Sympathy for the Devil (1998) was nominated for an Agatha award and an Edgar award and won the Macavity Award. Her second was nominated for an Agatha award and a Lefty award. She has also taught mystery writing at the UCLA Extension's Writers Program.

Books

Madeline Bean Series:
Sympathy for the Devil (1998)
Immaculate Reception (1999)
Killer Wedding (2000)
Dim Sum Dead (2001)
Mumbo Gumbo (2003)
Perfect Sax (2004)
The Flaming Luau of Death (2005)
Desperately Seeking Sushi (2006) - Never released

Other:
(with Joan Rivers) Murder at the Academy Awards (2009)

See also
Mystery (fiction)
List of female detective/mystery writers
List of female detective characters

References

External links
author's website 
interview

American mystery novelists
20th-century American novelists
Living people
Macavity Award winners
People from Lincolnwood, Illinois
Northern Illinois University alumni
21st-century American novelists
Women mystery writers
American women novelists
20th-century American women writers
21st-century American women writers
Year of birth missing (living people)